Hotel Sacred Heart (also called the Romborg Hotel from a combination of names of previous owners) is a 1914 brick hotel building in Sacred Heart, Minnesota, United States. It was added to the National Register of Historic Places in 2016 due to the efforts of a local group which received a historic preservation grant.

See also
 National Register of Historic Places listings in Renville County, Minnesota

References

1914 establishments in Minnesota
Buildings and structures in Renville County, Minnesota
National Register of Historic Places in Renville County, Minnesota